Jakob "Köbi" Kölliker (born 21 July 1953) is a retired Swiss ice hockey defenceman and current head coach of the Chinese women's national ice hockey team and the Chinese men's national junior ice hockey team. During his playing career, he represented  at the Winter Olympics in 1976 and 1988, serving as team captain at the later. He was inducted into the International Ice Hockey Federation Hall of Fame in 2007.

He was head coach of EV Bomo Thun of the Swiss Women's Hockey League A (SWHL A) from August 2019 to November 2020 and remains an advisor to the team.

References

External links 
 
 
 
 

1953 births
Living people
People from Biel/Bienne
Swiss ice hockey defencemen
Swiss ice hockey coaches
HC Ambrì-Piotta players
EHC Biel players
Ice hockey players at the 1976 Winter Olympics
Ice hockey players at the 1988 Winter Olympics
IIHF Hall of Fame inductees
Olympic ice hockey players of Switzerland
Sportspeople from the canton of Bern